Simon Combes (1940 – 12 December 2004) was an artist born in Shaftesbury, England.  Residing most of his life in Kenya, Combes was well known for his paintings of African wildlife and dedication to conservation.

In February 2005, the Artists For Conservation organization created a conservation award in the artist's honor.

References

External links
 Official website

1940 births
Animal artists
Wildlife artists
20th-century English painters
English male painters
21st-century English painters
21st-century English male artists
2004 deaths
20th-century English male artists